Madelyne may refer to:

 Madelyne Pryor, a fictional character in the Marvel Comics universe
 Carlo Resoort, a Dutch DJ, remixer and producer who has released tracks under the Madelyne alias